A frontal eminence (or tuber frontale) is either of two rounded elevations on the frontal bone of the skull. They lie about 3 cm above the supraorbital margin on each side of the frontal suture. They are the site of ossification of the frontal bone during embryological development, although may not be the first site.

The frontal eminences vary in size in different individuals, are occasionally asymmetrical, and are especially prominent in young skulls. The surface of the bone above them is smooth, and covered by the epicranial aponeurosis.

See also 
 Squama frontalis

References 

Bones of the head and neck

ru:Лобный бугор